Armigeres (Armigeres) subalbatus is a species complex of zoophilic mosquito belonging to the genus Armigeres. It is found in Sri Lanka, India, Bangladesh, Myanmar, Pakistan, Nepal, Japan, China, Korea, Taiwan, Ryukyu-Retto, Indochina, Thailand, and Guam.

Description
Larva carnivorous and can be found from pools with foul water or water with a high organic content. They are well modified to live in any water clogged place for the survival, which includes natural habitats like hollow logs, rock holes, tree holes, bamboo, Pandanus axils, sago palm and banana stumps, fruit shells and husks, fallen leaves and spathes, flower bracts, pitcher plants, and artificial containers having organic matter and small collections of ground water made by humans. Adults are more confined to dark forested areas and active mostly in crepuscular periods. Females are primarily human-biters.

Medical importance
It is a natural vector for filarial worms such as zoonotic Brugia pahangi, and Wuchereria bancrofti, which cause filariasis to humans.

References

External links
Armigeres subalbatus (Diptera: Culicidae) prophenoloxidase III is required for mosquito cuticle formation: ultrastructural study on dsRNA-knockdown mosquitoes.
Mosquito Transcriptome Profiles and Filarial Worm Susceptibility in Armigeres subalbatus

subalbatus
Insects described in 1898